Ristananna Bailey-Cole ( Tracey; born 9 May 1992) is a Jamaican athlete specialising in the 400 metres hurdles. She represented her country at three consecutive World Championships reaching the semifinals in 2011 and 2013. She placed fifth at the 2016 Olympics. She made her best run to date at the IAAF World Championships in London on August 10, 2017 finishing with the bronze medal in a personal best 53.74.

International competitions

Personal bests
Outdoor
200 metres – 23.88 (+0.7 m/s, Velenje 2011)
400 metres – 51.95 (Kingston 2011)
800 metres – 2:03.97 (Kingston 2011)
400 metres hurdles – 53.74 (London 2017)

References

External links

1992 births
Living people
Jamaican female hurdlers
World Athletics Championships athletes for Jamaica
Athletes (track and field) at the 2015 Pan American Games
Place of birth missing (living people)
Athletes (track and field) at the 2016 Summer Olympics
Olympic athletes of Jamaica
Athletes (track and field) at the 2018 Commonwealth Games
World Athletics Championships medalists
Commonwealth Games competitors for Jamaica
Pan American Games competitors for Jamaica
20th-century Jamaican women
21st-century Jamaican women